Aleksan Nalbandyan (born April 18, 1971 in Yerevan) is an Armenian and Russian amateur boxer. He was a runner up at the 2004 Acropolis Cup. Nalbandyan won a gold medal at the 1st AIBA European 2004 Olympic Qualifying Tournament. He competed at the 2004 Summer Olympics in the light flyweight division.

References

External links
Sports-Reference.com

1971 births
Living people
Sportspeople from Yerevan
Soviet male boxers
Armenian male boxers
Light-flyweight boxers
Olympic boxers of Armenia
Boxers at the 2004 Summer Olympics
Russian male boxers
Soviet Armenians
Russian people of Armenian descent
AIBA World Boxing Championships medalists